Chris Canty may refer to:

Chris Canty (defensive back) (born 1976), former cornerback for the New England Patriots, Seattle Seahawks, and New Orleans Saints
Chris Canty (defensive lineman) (born 1982), Free agent defensive end